Clive Khulubuse Zuma is a South African businessman, and the nephew of the former President, Jacob Zuma.

Zuma was named in the Panama Papers leak as a result of his links to oilfields in the Democratic Republic of the Congo (DRC). Shortly after President Zuma, his uncle, met with DRC president Joseph Kabila, Zuma's company Caprikat Limited secured a R100 billion rand oil deal in the DRC.

In 2014, he got engaged to Swazi princess, Fikisiwe Dlamini.

References

Living people
South African businesspeople
Zulu people
People named in the Panama Papers
Year of birth missing (living people)